Åkerö, also called Akero or Okera, is an old apple cultivar of presumed Swedish origin, but possibly introduced from the Netherlands. It is a dessert apple with an aromatic flavor.

Åkerö was first described by pomologist Olof Eneroth in 1858; parentage is unknown. It is probably named after the Åkerö Manor located south of Stockholm, Sweden where according to some it was originally found as a seedling. Today it is still cultivated in Sweden and is regarded as the best Swedish apple. It was once very popular in Scandinavia and northern Germany.

The tree is hardy and vigorous with an upright growing habit. It needs cross pollination from a compatible cultivar, and gives a good crop of medium- to large-sized oval fruit. The skin color is a pale primrose with pink flush, and the flesh is juicy with a refreshing raspberry-like flavor and a pale cream color.

Åkerö is a summer apple and fruits are picked in August. It is the best summer apple after Early Joe, but is larger in size and has excellent keeping quality for a summer apple.

References

Apple cultivars